Ornithinimicrobium pekingense is a Gram-positive bacterium species from the genus Ornithinimicrobium which has been isolated from activated sludge.

References 

 

Actinomycetia
Bacteria described in 2008